Savji Dhanji Dholakia (born 12 April 1962) is an Indian businessman. He is the founder and chairman of Hari Krishna Exports, a diamond manufacturing and exporting company. He was awarded the Padma Shri in 2022.

Biography
Savji Dholakia was born in a farmer family in Dudhala, Amreli district, Gujarat. He studied till 4th standard and dropped out at the age 13. He joined his paternal uncle's diamond business in Surat. Later his brothers Himmat and Tulsi also joined him and they founded the diamond business in 1984. Their youngest brother Ghanshyam joined them and opened a diamond export office in Mumbai in 1992. The company grew and became major diamond exporting company with 6500 employees by 2014.

He was awarded the Padma Shri by the Government of India in 2022 for his contribution in field of social work.

See also
 Hari Krishna Exports

References

External links

1962 births
Indian billionaires
Businesspeople from Gujarat
People from Surat
Gujarati people
Living people
People from Amreli district
Diamond dealers
Recipients of the Padma Shri in social work